Miroslav Živković (Gornje Krnjino, 1934 – Pirot, 18 February 2009) was a Serbian naïve art painter.

Biography 
Živković was born in the village of Gornje Krnjino near Pirot in 1934. He lived and worked in Pirot and died there in 2009. He began painting in 1955. The favorite source of his paintings was the Stara planina mountain near Pirot. He combined inner scenes and fantasy with mountain meadows, glades and forest.

Exhibitions 
The largest collection of his paintings is at the Museum of Naïve and Marginal Art in Jagodina, Serbia.

Gallery

References

Literature 
 M. Bošković; M. Maširević, Samouki likovni umetnici u Srbiji, Turin, 1977
 Ото Бихаљи-Мерин; Небојша Бато Томашевић, Енциклопедија наивне уметности света, Belgrade, 1984
 Љ. Којић, Завичајни хроничари - Мирослав Живковић, у: Наивна уметност Србије, САНУ, МNMA, Jagodina, 2003; 128
 N. Krstić, Naivna umetnost u Srbiji, SANU, MNMA, Jagodina, 2003
 Lj. Kojić, Мирослав Живковић у збирци МНМУ, MNMA, Jagodina, 2009
 N. Krstić, Naive and Marginal Art in Serbia, MNMA, Jagodina, 2007
 N. Krstić, Miroslav Živković, MNMA, Jagodina, 2009.

External links 

 Museum of Naïve and Marginal Art, Jagodina, Serbia

Naïve painters
Yugoslav painters
20th-century Serbian painters
1934 births
2009 deaths
Serbian male painters
20th-century Serbian male artists